, there were about 40,000 electric vehicles in Virginia, accounting for 0.5% of all vehicles in the state. , 2% of new vehicles sold in the state were electric.

Government policy
In 2021, the state government introduced a tax rebate of $2,500 for electric vehicle purchases. The same year, the state government introduced an annual $88.20 registration fee for electric vehicles.

The state government plans to require at least 8% of new cars sold in the state to be electric by 2024, will require all new cars sold to be electric by 2035.

Charging stations
, there were about 840 public charging station locations with 2,000 charging ports in Virginia. , there were 478 public DC charging ports in the state.

The Infrastructure Investment and Jobs Act, signed into law in November 2021, allocates  to charging stations in Virginia.

By region

Richmond
, 2% of new cars registered in the Greater Richmond Region were electric.

Washington metropolitan area

, there were about 4,000 electric vehicles registered in Fairfax County. , there were 194 charging stations in Fairfax County.

References

Virginia
Road transportation in Virginia